The 2020 Southern Illinois Salukis football team represented Southern Illinois University Carbondale as a member of the Missouri Valley Football Conference (MVFC) during the 2020–21 NCAA Division I FCS football season. Led by fifth-year head coach Nick Hill, the Salukis compiled an overall record of 6–4 with a mark of 3–3 in conference play, placing fifth in the MVFC. Southern Illinois received an at-large berth in the NCAA Division I Football Championship playoffs, where they beat Weber State in the first round before  losing to the eventual national runner-up, South Dakota State in the quarterfinals. The team played home games at Saluki Stadium in Carbondale, Illinois.

Schedule
Southern Illinois had a game scheduled against Wisconsin on September 12, which was later canceled before the start of the 2020 season. An August 29 matchup with Kansas was announced on July 25.

References

Southern Illinois
Southern Illinois Salukis football seasons
Southern Illinois
Southern Illinois Salukis football